Greatest Events of WWII in Colour is a 10-episode British television docuseries recounting major events of World War II.

Episodes

References

External links
 
 

2019 British television series debuts
2019 British television series endings
2010s British documentary television series
World War II television documentaries
Documentary television series about World War II
English-language television shows
Discovery Channel original programming